The Capitão Cardoso River is a river forming part of the border between Rondônia and Mato Grosso states in western Brazil. It is a tributary of the Roosevelt River.

Hydrology
The river's watershed is a sub-basin of the Roosevelt River and its headwaters are located in an indigenous reserve near Chapada dos Parecis.

See also
List of rivers of Rondônia
List of rivers of Mato Grosso

References

Brazilian Ministry of Transport
 Caracterização morfométrica da sub-bacia hidrográfica do rio Capitão Cardoso Tenente Marques, Rondônia, Brasil

Rivers of Rondônia
Rivers of Mato Grosso